The 2016 Silverstone GP2 Series round was a GP2 Series motor race held on 9 and 10 July 2016 at the Silverstone Circuit in the United Kingdom. It was the fifth round of the 2016 GP2 Series. The race weekend supported the 2016 British Grand Prix.

Background
ART Grand Prix's Nobuharu Matsushita returned to the series after serving his one-round ban in Austria.

Report

Qualifying
In a somewhat controversial manner, Norman Nato achieved the fastest time of 1:38.216, thereby achieving his first pole position of the year. He was under investigation for setting his pole lap under red flag conditions. He was deemed by officials to set the lap time under green conditions and his pole time stood. Pierre Gasly achieved second place two-tenths behind Nato and Nicholas Latifi achieved a career-best of third.

Notes
1. – Sirotkin was penalised after he failed to stop at the weighbridge and the car was not brought back before the mechanics worked on it, thereby violating the parc ferme ruling. He started from the pitlane.
2. – Canamasas received a three-place grid penalty after having been deemed to demonstrate unsporting behaviour towards Oliver Rowland after the conclusion of practice.

Feature Race
The preferred tyre strategy for the feature race was often to start on the hard compound and then to switch to soft later in the race. Prema Racing went against this using the opposite strategy to great effect, with Pierre Gasly taking his maiden GP2 win from teammate Antonio Giovinazzi. Oliver Rowland also went with this strategy, achieving third despite struggling for grip in the dying laps. This result elevates both Prema drivers to first and second in the standings, with Evans maintaining third.

Notes
1. – Rowland was given a five-second time penalty for excessive over-use of track limits.

Sprint Race
The sprint race saw another dominant performance from Jordan King who led from start to finish despite a late charge from Luca Ghiotto. The race was rather calm for the most part until three-laps from the end when the rain started to descend upon the circuit. As the circuit became more and more slippery, the drivers soon found themselves struggling for grip. Norman Nato spun off and several others left the circuit. Rowland passed Matsushita in the final laps to achieve another podium, the only driver to do so throughout the weekend.

Standings after the round

Drivers' Championship standings

Teams' Championship standings

 Note: Only the top five positions are included for both sets of standings.

See also 
 2016 British Grand Prix
 2016 Silverstone GP3 Series round

References

External links 
 Official website of GP2 Series

Silverstone
Silverstone
Silverstone